Elvaston is a village in Hancock County, Illinois, United States. The population was 165 at the 2010 census, an increase from 152 in 2000.

Geography
Elvaston is located in west-central Hancock County at  (40.396983, -91.250296). U.S. Route 136 passes through the center of the village, leading east  to Carthage, the county seat, and west  to Hamilton on the Mississippi River.

Demographics

As of the 2000 United States Census, 152 people, 67 households, and 45 families resided in the village. The racial makeup of the village was 99.34% White and 0.66% African American.

Out of 67 households, 31.3% had children under the age of 18 living with them, 47.8% were married couples living together, 10.4% had a female householder with no husband present, and 32.8% were non-families. 31.3% of all households were made up of individuals, and 22.4% had someone living alone who was 65 years of age or older. The average household size was 2.27 and the average family size was 2.69.

In the village, the population was spread out, with 23.0% under the age of 18, 7.9% from 18 to 24, 25.0% from 25 to 44, 27.0% from 45 to 64, and 17.1% who were 65 years of age or older. The median age was 39 years, with 94.9 males for every 100 females total, and 77.3 males for every 100 females aged at least 18.

The median income for a household in the village was US$34,792, and the median income for a family was $45,833. Males had a median income of $35,000 versus $16,818 for females. The per capita income for the village was $27,947. About 11.5% of families and 12.7% of the population were below the poverty line, including 25.6% of those under the age of eighteen and 8.7% of those 65 or over.

References

External links

Villages in Hancock County, Illinois
Villages in Illinois